Alpha Diallo may refer to:

 Black M (born 1984), French rapper and singer-songwriter

 Alfa Ntiallo (born 1992), or Alpha Diallo, Guinean-Greek basketball player
 Alpha Diallo (basketball, born 1997), American basketball player
 Alpha Yaya Diallo, Guinean-born Canadian guitarist, singer and songwriter